The following is a list of Research Institutes, Centres and Units of the University of Galway.

Designated Research Institutes

 Data Science Institute (DSI)
 Ryan Institute
 Whitaker Institute for Innovation and Societal Change
 Institute for Lifecourse and Society
 Moore Institute for Research in the Humanities and Social Studies

Research Centres and Units

 Alimentary Glycoscience Research Cluster (AGRC)
 Apoptosis Research Centre
 Applied Optics Group
 Biodiversity and Bioresources Research Cluster
 BioEconomy Research Cluster
 Bioinformatics and Biostatistics Research Cluster
 Biomechanics Research Centre
 Built Environment and Smart Cities Research Cluster
 Centre for Neuroimaging and Cognitive Genomics (NICOG)
 Centre for Antique, Medieval, and Pre-Modern Studies (CAMPS)
 Centre for Applied Linguistics and Multilingualism (CALM)
 Centre for Astronomy (CfA)
 Centre for Chromosome Biology (CCB)
 Centre for Climate & Air Pollution Studies (C-CAPS)
 Centre for Creative Arts Research (CCAR)
 Centre for Crystallography
 Centre for Disability Law & Policy (CDLP)
 Centre for Drama, Theatre and Performance
 Centre for Economic Research on Inclusivity and Sustainability (CERIS)
 Centre for Economic and Social Research on Dementia (CESRD)
 Centre for Entrepreneurial Growth and Scaling (CEGS)
 Centre for Global Women's Studies
 Centre for International Development Innovation (CIDI)
 Centre for Irish Studies
 Centre for Landscape Studies
 Centre for Ocean Research and Exploration
 Centre for One Health
 Centre for Pain Research
 Centre for Photonics and Imaging
 Centre for the Investigation of Transnational Encounters (CITE)
 Centre for Microscopy and Imaging (CMI)
 Combustion Chemistry Centre
 CÚRAM Centre for Research in Medical Devices
 De Brún Centre for Mathematics
 Economic and Social Impact Research Cluster
 Energy Research Centre
 Galway Neuroscience Centre
 Geo-ENvironmental Engineering (GENE)
 Health Behaviour Change Research Group (HBCRG)
 Health Economics & Policy Analysis Centre (HEPAC)
 Health Promotion Research Centre
 HRB Cinical Research Facility Galway
 Huston School of Film & Digital Media
 Informatics Research Unit for Sustainable Engineering (IRUSE)
 Irish Centre for Autism and Neurodevelopmental Research (ICAN)
 Irish Centre for High End Computing (ICHEC)
 Irish Centre for Human Rights
 Irish Centre for Research in Applied Geosciences (iCRAG)
 Irish Centre for Social Gerontology (ICSG)
 Irish Centre for the Histories of Labour & Class (ICHLC)
 Modelling and Informatics Research Cluster
 Nanoscale Biophotonics
 National Centre for Laser Applications (NCLA)
 Palaeoenvironmental Research Unit
 Plant & AgriBiosciences Research Centre
 Plant & AgriBiosciences Research Centre (PABC)
 Power Electronics Research Centre (PERC)
 Regenerative Medicine Institute (REMEDI)
 Ryan Institute MaREI Galway
 Social Science Research Centre
 Socio Economic Marine Research Unit (SEMRU)
 Stokes Applied Research Cluster
 UNESCO Child and Family Research Centre

References

University of Galway
Lists of research institutes
Ireland science-related lists
University of Galway, List of
Science and technology in the Republic of Ireland